"No" is a song by American pop-rock group Bulldog.  It was the first release from their 1972 eponymous debut album. Vocals are provided by bassist Billy Hocher, with a sound similar to Joe Cocker.

The song became an international hit, reaching #44 in the U.S. and #63 in Canada.  "No" did best in Australia and New Zealand, where it became a Top 20 hit.
It also peaked at #2 on 2NUR (Sydney/Newcastle) in February 1973.

The album including "No" reached the Top 10 in Australia.

"No" was included on the 1972 K-Tel compilation album Believe in Music.

Chart history

Weekly charts

Year-end charts

References

External links
 

1972 songs
1972 singles
Decca Records singles
MCA Records singles